The cuneiform sign ṣur, is a common-use sign of the Amarna letters, the Epic of Gilgamesh, and other cuneiform texts (for example Hittite texts).

Linguistically, it has the alphabetical usage in texts for ṣ, or z; also r; for vowels, u, or as a replacement for the other three vowels, "a", "e", or "i".

Epic of Gilgamesh usage
The ṣur sign usage in the Epic of Gilgamesh is as follows: (ṣur, 6 times, zur, 1 time, and AMAR, 1 time.

Gallery

References

 Parpola, 1971. The Standard Babylonian Epic of Gilgamesh, Parpola, Simo, Neo-Assyrian Text Corpus Project, c 1997, Tablet I thru Tablet XII, Index of Names, Sign List,

Cuneiform signs